The Team free routine competition of the Synchronised swimming events at the 2011 World Aquatics Championships was held on July 20 with the preliminary round and the final on 23 July.

Medalists

Results
The preliminary round was held on July 20. The final was held on July 23.

Green denotes finalists

References

External links
2011 World Aquatics Championships: Team free routine start list, from OmegaTiming.com; retrieved 2011-07-19.

Team free routine